Te Henga, or Bethells Beach, is a coastal community in West Auckland, New Zealand. This name originally applied to a wide area of the lower Waitakere River valley, but during the early 1900s the area became popular with visiting European immigrants who began to refer to the area as "Bethells Beach" after the Bethell Family who live there and still own much of the area. In 1976 the New Zealand Geographic Board officially named the area "Te Henga (Bethells Beach)".

One of several popular resorts in the area (others include Muriwai, Piha and Karekare), it is rated  the 4th most dangerous beach in New Zealand to swim at due to its strong rips and currents. There have been many fatalities including in 2009, Rugby League star Sonny Fai, who was never located.

History and culture  

The Te Henga Valley shows evidence of human settlement dating back many centuries. Carbon dating of midden shells at Kauwahaia Island date settlement back to at least the year 1600. The cultural history of the area is of archaeologically significant sites, including food gathering areas, pā (fortifications), walkways, canoe landings and sacred places. Te Henga and the Waitākere River have traditionally been major settled areas for the iwi Te Kawerau ā Maki, with many pā found around the islands, headland and inland areas close to Te Henga. A rock in the beach to the north-west of Ihumoana Island is the namesake of Wai-tākere ("cascading water"), which was later applied to the Waitākere River, Ranges, and West Auckland in general.

In the mid 1800s, much of the area was designated as the Waitakere and Puketotara Native Reserve. These native reserves were to be ‘inalienable’ for Kawerau people to live on in perpetuity. The provision of the native reserves was largely undermined by the Native Land Court, created in 1865, which was based on the settlers' legal system, and converted customary title to land into individual title. Over the following decades much of the land was sold to European immigrants. The arrival of Europeans in the 19th century led to major changes in the character and shape of Te Henga (Bethells Beach). The most significant of these changes was the clearing of the land for timber and pastoral farming which began in 1854 and continued until the 1920s. In addition, a dam was constructed on the Waitakere River in the 1920s, drastically altering the level of the riverbed and reducing the outflow of water to the sea. Prior to the dam being constructed, the Waitākere River catchment at Te Henga was a site where New Zealand flax was harvested.

John Bethell negotiated with the Waitakere County Council to sell the land that is now known as Te Henga Park. The Council considered the beach and park area would provide excellent recreation facilities for residents of Auckland. Te Henga was recognised as a place of regional significance.

Demographics
The settlement is part of the larger Muriwai Valley-Bethells Beach statistical area.

Bethells Beach had a population of 264 at the 2018 New Zealand census, an increase of 9 people (3.5%) since the 2013 census, and an increase of 3 people (1.1%) since the 2006 census. There were 117 households, comprising 132 males and 138 females, giving a sex ratio of 0.96 males per female, with 39 people (14.8%) aged under 15 years, 42 (15.9%) aged 15 to 29, 159 (60.2%) aged 30 to 64, and 21 (8.0%) aged 65 or older.

Ethnicities were 96.6% European/Pākehā, 10.2% Māori, 4.5% Pacific peoples, and 3.4% Asian. People may identify with more than one ethnicity.

Although some people chose not to answer the census's question about religious affiliation, 67.0% had no religion, 17.0% were Christian, 1.1% had Māori religious beliefs, 2.3% were Buddhist and 3.4% had other religions.

Of those at least 15 years old, 78 (34.7%) people had a bachelor's or higher degree, and 21 (9.3%) people had no formal qualifications. 48 people (21.3%) earned over $70,000 compared to 17.2% nationally. The employment status of those at least 15 was that 120 (53.3%) people were employed full-time, 39 (17.3%) were part-time, and 9 (4.0%) were unemployed.

Muriwai Valley-Bethells Beach statistical area

Muriwai Valley-Bethells Beach had a population of 1,104 at the 2018 New Zealand census, an increase of 159 people (16.8%) since the 2013 census, and an increase of 279 people (33.8%) since the 2006 census. There were 372 households, comprising 564 males and 540 females, giving a sex ratio of 1.04 males per female. The median age was 39.2 years (compared with 37.4 years nationally), with 237 people (21.5%) aged under 15 years, 177 (16.0%) aged 15 to 29, 570 (51.6%) aged 30 to 64, and 120 (10.9%) aged 65 or older.

Ethnicities were 96.5% European/Pākehā, 10.1% Māori, 3.0% Pacific peoples, 1.6% Asian, and 1.4% other ethnicities. People may identify with more than one ethnicity.

The percentage of people born overseas was 20.4, compared with 27.1% nationally.

Although some people chose not to answer the census's question about religious affiliation, 67.1% had no religion, 23.4% were Christian, 0.5% had Māori religious beliefs, 0.5% were Buddhist and 1.9% had other religions.

Of those at least 15 years old, 246 (28.4%) people had a bachelor's or higher degree, and 90 (10.4%) people had no formal qualifications. The median income was $38,600, compared with $31,800 nationally. 228 people (26.3%) earned over $70,000 compared to 17.2% nationally. The employment status of those at least 15 was that 489 (56.4%) people were employed full-time, 168 (19.4%) were part-time, and 27 (3.1%) were unemployed.

Marae

Te Henga is a tribal meeting ground for the local iwi of Te Kawerau a Maki. Historically there were several marae spread around the Te Henga (Bethells Beach) area, however these sites are now all in private ownership and housing. Currently the iwi are in negotiations with Auckland Council to set up a new marae at Te Henga so they can return to their ancestral heartland.

Geology

7,000 years ago, when sea-levels rose after the Last Glacial Maximum, Te Henga / Bethells Beach and the surrounding area including Lake Wainamu formed a part of the Waitākere River tidal estuary. Over time, Tasman Sea sand accumulated at Te Henga, forming sand dunes and freshwater lakes. The sand dunes have accumulated in several phases over the last 4,500 years. These sands contain quantities of black titanomagnetite derived from the volcanic rocks of Taranaki and carried north by coastal currents. The dunes continually move in a dynamic coastal process. There are three dune-impounded lakes: Lake Wainamu, Lake Kawaupaku and Lake Waiataru.

The Te Henga wetlands originally formed as a freshwater lake during the same time period as the three remaining lakes. The lake was destroyed in 1910 with the construction of the Waitākere Dam and Reservoir, which made water-levels rise and the water to become more silty. The wetlands began forming in the mid-1920s.

Ecology of the Waitakere River catchment 

The Waitākere River catchment consists of roughly 70 km2 of the bush-clad Waitākere Ranges. Located on the west coast of the Auckland Region approximately 75% of the catchment consists of native vegetation in spite of extensive milling, farming and settlement.

The major features of the catchment are:
 the abundance of native vegetation
 the steep and rugged terrain
 the Te Henga wetland 
 the sand dunes
 Lake Wainamu
 The Waitākere Reservoir

The Waitakere River has two main tributaries, the Mokoroa and Waiti streams. The headwaters of the river are in the vast and steep Waitākere Ranges and drain out at the Bethell's Beach river mouth.

In comparison with other North Island beaches, and to some extent even the west coast beaches of Muriwai and Piha, settlement at Bethells has been minor with most development revolving around horticulture and agriculture.

With the exception of the Waitākere Reservoir the catchments resources have largely escaped development.

In 1990 the Auckland Regional Water Board developed and prepared a Waitakere River Catchment Water and Soil Plan. This pre-Resource Management Act document aimed to deal with the competing water and soil resource demands within the catchment in terms of "conservation, allocation, use and quality of natural water and in terms of soil conservation and preventing damage from flooding." Although this document reached its quarter-century in 2015, many of its principles still apply.

Activity 
 Surfing is the main pastime. Other pastimes include parasailing and hang gliding, for which the prevailing westerly wind often provides favourable conditions.
 Fishing is also popular, although dangerous in many places and many deaths have taken place from this.
 Bush walking is encouraged, with boardwalks in place.
 Sunbathing, swimming, picnics, running etc.
 Skimboarding is also becoming quite popular with young people.

Filming location
The beach has been used as a filming location for several projects, one of the earliest being a four-month shoot for award-winning drama series Children of Fire Mountain (1979). Other shoots include the music video for Shania Twain's single "Forever and for Always"(2003), "Out of the Woods" for Taylor Swift, TV series The New Adventures of Black Beauty and The Wilds, Brit/New Zealand TV movie The Man Who Lost His Head, and episodes of Xena: Warrior Princess, Young Hercules, and Hercules: The Legendary Journeys. Battle scenes for New Disney Channel Original movie Avalon High were also filmed there. In addition, K-pop singer Taeyeon's first solo music video I, and the end scenes of Crouching Tiger, Hidden Dragon: Sword of Destiny were also filmed here.

Gallery

References

External links
Bethells Beach Surf Life Saving Patrol 
Photographs of Te Henga held in Auckland Libraries' heritage collections.

Beaches of the Auckland Region
Waitākere Ranges
Waitākere Ranges Local Board Area
Populated places in the Auckland Region
Black sand beaches
West Auckland, New Zealand